Berberis amplectens is a rare species of shrubs endemic to the Peninsular Ranges of southern California, east of San Diego.

Description
It is an evergreen shrub up to 1.2 m (4 feet tall), with compound leaves and dark blue berries. 
It can be distinguished from other species in the genus by having numerous teeth along the leaf margins, as many as 15 per leaflet.

The compound leaves place this species in the group sometimes segregated as the genus Mahonia.

References

amplectens
Endemic flora of California
Natural history of the California chaparral and woodlands
Natural history of the Peninsular Ranges
Natural history of San Diego County, California
Taxa named by Alice Eastwood
Flora without expected TNC conservation status